Microtheca is a genus of Chrysomelinae (a subfamily of leaf beetles).

Species
M. ochroloma Stål, 1860	 
M. picea Guérin-Méneville, 1844

References

Chrysomelidae genera
Chrysomelinae